Westendorf is a municipality  in the district of Ostallgäu in Bavaria in Germany.

The municipality of Westendorf, which consists of the villages of Dösingen and Westendorf, is located in the Allgäu region, about eleven kilometres east of Kaufbeuren, in the northern part of the Ostallgäu district.

References

External links 

 
  (PDF; 1,05 MB)

Ostallgäu